The Element of Freedom is the fourth studio album by American singer and songwriter Alicia Keys, released on December 11, 2009, by J Records. Recording sessions for the album took place during May to September 2009 at the Oven Studios in Long Island, New York. Production was primarily handled by Keys, Kerry Brothers Jr., and Jeff Bhasker. Departing from the classicist soul music of Keys' previous albums, The Element of Freedom has a mid-tempo, low-key sound and features mostly love songs.

Upon its release, the album received generally positive reviews from music critics, who complimented its low-key style, cohesiveness, and Keys' singing, while some were ambivalent towards the lyrics. The album debuted at number two on the US Billboard 200 chart, selling 417,000 copies in its first week. It was certified platinum by the Recording Industry Association of America (RIAA) within its first month of release (later being certified double platinum) and produced six singles. By August 2012, The Element of Freedom had sold over four million copies worldwide.

Recording and production

After recording her third studio album, As I Am, Keys began to "find the way to totally be myself and what that meant; figuring out what choices I wanted to make and not make in order to truly honor myself". Keys began working on the album in May 2009. During this time, Keys and her Audio engineer bought several vintage keyboards, describing the Moog as her "special best friend". Recording took place at Keys' Oven Studios in Long Island, New York. Keys expressed that she "didn't know what to do" when she began working on the album, but knew to do it. After exhausting herself, she stated that she "finally found the key, and that is to allow yourself to be free". She explained that the album dealt with overcoming depression, going on to say: "I found more freedom. Before, I thought I could only show the strong side of me. Now there’s a mixture of strong and delicate. A new sound, a new emotion. That’s a lot of who I am right now". Recording for the album was completed between August and September 2009. Keys described that she "love[d] melody so much", but approached the album with a "free zone". The album includes production by Kerry "Krucial" Brothers, Jeff Bhasker, Noah "40" Shebib and Swizz Beatz.

MTV News reported that Keys and rapper Jay-Z recorded "Empire State of Mind Part 2", a second version of "Empire State of Mind" from Jay-Z's album The Blueprint 3. The final product, titled "Empire State of Mind (Part II) Broken Down", did not feature Jay-Z. In mid-November 2009, Brothers revealed on Twitter that Canadian recording artist Drake would be featured on the album. Drake described the studio session with Keys as "one of the best studio experiences of my life". He explained that "I came in there and instead of being like, 'Here's the beat, get to work,' she was just like, 'Play me your favorite songs and lets battle'... It's almost like the transition from [listening to] great music to making a song — like, no one even noticed it, because she started playing the keys and I just started writing the melodies." Keys stated that due to the album being pushed back, she was able to record "How It Feels to Fly", as well as to work with Drake and Beyoncé, which Keys described as "the most exciting collaborations of my career yet". Keys revealed to The Times that in the period she was recording the album, she listened to artists such as Genesis, Tears for Fears, Fleetwood Mac and The Police. In an interview with Billboard, Keys stated that she "eliminated all of the boundaries and all the limitations, so that you can feel your freedom and express your freedom in every way you possibly can".

Music and lyrics

Music writers have noted Keys' transition from 1960s and 1970s R&B and soul to 1980s and 1990s pop-oriented sound with the album. Ben Ratliff of The New York Times described most of the album's songs as "professionals ... slow, clean songs with semi-classical acoustic piano, soft-pop chord changes and simple, prominent hip-hop beats". The Washington Posts Allison Stewart wrote that the album "relies unusually heavily upon mid-tempo, carefully layered lovesick ballads". Keys received some comparisons to musician Prince. Slant Magazine's Matthew Cole wrote that "some retro synth work lends a funky backdrop" to Keys' "breathy vamping, alternating disco-diva choruses with Prince-worthy verses". Stephen Thomas Erlewine of AllMusic pointed out the "always apparent" influence of Prince, as Keys "swapped the retro-soul instrumentation of her earliest music for electronics". He identified the album as "clean, small-scale collection of ballads and Prince-inspired pop". Several writers also noted that the album's tenth track, "Put It in a Love Song", distinguishes itself from the rest of the album, being described as having "dreamy, sun-dazed production" and is "quantitatively different energy".

Keys described The Element of Freedom as diverse, but noted that there is a "balance". She explained that "one side is strong and one side is vulnerable", which she pointed to as the theme of the album. The album has a "strong, edgy feel", but is also "intimate and vulnerable and delicate". While on BET's 106 & Park, she described the album: "The way that the songs progress [on the album] are gonna take you on a natural high. I just want you to feel a sense of freedom, I want you to feel out-of-the-box, feel inspired, You're definitely going to be taken on a trip, I know you're going to be shocked, you're going to hear things that you probably didn't think that I would sound like. It's a journey." The Element of Freedom is composed mostly of love songs, whose lyrics deal with relationships, falling in love, and/or heartbreak. The lead single "Doesn't Mean Anything" has a similar theme to Keys' previous single "If I Ain't Got You" (2004) from her second studio album The Diary of Alicia Keys (2003)–choosing love over materialism. However, some of the songs feature different lyrical themes: "Wait Til You See My Smile" is about one not allowing negative people to defeat them, "How It Feels to Fly" is about taking risks just to experience their positive side, and "Empire State of Mind (Part II) Broken Down" contains references to various locations in New York City and its famous residents, while describing the city's essence. The album's Empire Edition includes a cover of Michael Jackson's 1975 song "We're Almost There" on its bonus disc, alongside the song "Lover Man" and live versions of Keys' singles from previous albums.

Release and promotion
On September 14, 2009, the day after the 2009 MTV Video Music Awards, Keys posted the audio to the album's lead single "Doesn't Mean Anything" on her YouTube channel. The song was released via iTunes Store on September 22. In October, she performed the song on Live with Regis and Kelly. On October 21, Keys held "The Element of Freedom Lecture & Performance Series" at the New York University, free for students at the Tisch School of the Arts. Among the songs she performed included the then-new "Try Sleeping with a Broken Heart". The song, produced by Keys and Jeff Bhasker, was released as the second single from the album. The music video premiered on November 16. Keys performed a medley of "Empire State of Mind", "Doesn't Mean Anything" and "No One" on the sixth season of The X Factor on November 29. Keys performed a benefit concert at the Nokia Theater in New York City on December 1, where all the proceeds went to the Keep a Child Alive program. The concert—held on World AIDS Day—was streamed live via YouTube. As part of the promotional drive for the album, she performed at the Cayman Islands Jazz Festival on December 5, the final night of the three-day festival which would be broadcast on BET. The Element of Freedom was originally scheduled to be released that day, to correspond with World AIDS Day, but was pushed back to December 15 for additional recording. According to the senior vice president of urban marketing for J Records, Keys "had a couple of more things in the oven and she wants this to be right [...] So we gave her the additional time she needed." Keys pointed out that she felt the album was being rushed for no reason. In an interview with Scottish newspaper The Scotsman, she stated that it "seems unfair to have to rush these songs that were still coming and not allow them to be the best songs they could be. It was just two weeks' difference, but it made for an even better record". On December 16, BET's 106 & Park hosted a two-hour special titled 106 & Keys, which consisted of a countdown of Keys' videos and a live performance.

A week prior to its release, Keys streamed The Element of Freedom in its entirety on the peer-to-peer music streaming service Spotify, as well as social networking website Facebook through a Facebook Platform. She became the first major recording artist in Facebook's history to do so. The Element of Freedom was released in the United States on December 15, having been released internationally four days earlier. Its deluxe edition with two bonus tracks and a bonus DVD was released simultaneously with the standard edition; in the United States, both editions were accompanied by the double-disc Empire Edition. The "Alicia Keys & Friends" concert took place on January 7, 2010, at the Apollo Theater in New York City. In addition to her performances, Keys introduced new artists who also performed during the event. Keys also performed on Saturday Night Live on January 9, followed by an AOL Music Sessions premiere on January 14. On February 14, Keys performed with recording artists Usher and Shakira at the 2010 NBA All-Star Game during halftime. At the show, Keys performed "No One" from her 2007 album As I Am. She also performed "Empire State of Mind" as well "Try Sleeping with a Broken Heart". On March 3, Keys embarked on the North American leg of the Freedom Tour at the Allstate Arena in Rosemont, Illinois. The European leg of the tour started in late April. Keys performed at the Essence Music Festival taking place July 2–4, 2010. In April, Keys announced a reissue of the album, which ultimately never materialized.

Singles

Keys released "Doesn't Mean Anything" as the lead single from The Element of Freedom on September 22, 2009. Critics gave the song positive reviews, comparing it to previous singles "No One", "Superwoman" and "If I Ain't Got You". In Europe, the song reached the top five in Switzerland and top ten in the United Kingdom. It peaked at number 14 on the US R&B/Hip-Hop Songs chart but only managed to reach number 60 on the Billboard Hot 100.

On November 17, 2009, Keys released the second single "Try Sleeping with a Broken Heart". It received critical acclaim as the album's standout moment for its timeless synths and throwbacks to the 1980s. The song was more successful than "Doesn't Mean Anything", reaching number two in Norway and five in Denmark, as well as number 27 on the Billboard Hot 100 and number two on the Hot R&B/Hip-Hop Songs. It was later released in the United Kingdom as the album's third single, where it would go on to peak at number seven.

"Put It in a Love Song", featuring Beyoncé, was released as the third single from the album in January 2010. It did best in Australia, where it peaked at number 18 and was certified gold by the Australian Recording Industry Association (ARIA). However, it received only a limited release in the United States. Its accompanying music video was due to be released in March 2010 but was cancelled so "Un-Thinkable (I'm Ready)" could be pushed forward as a single instead. Despite this, "Put It in a Love Song" peaked at number 60 on the Hot R&B/Hip-Hop Songs.

Following the album's release, Keys' version of "Empire State of Mind" charted due to digital sales. It was released as an international single in February 2010 and was the best charting single from the album in several territories. It peaked at number four in the UK, six in the Netherlands, and number eight in Ireland. It also peaked at number 55 on the Billboard Hot 100.

Meanwhile, in the United States, "Un-Thinkable (I'm Ready)" began to make its impact starting April 13. It was the most successful single from the album in the US, topping the Hot R&B/Hip-Hop Songs for 12 consecutive weeks, as well as reaching number 21 on the Billboard Hot 100. A remix featuring Drake was released on May 28.

Following the birth of her first child on October 16, Keys revealed that "Wait Til You See My Smile" would be released as the next single in the UK on November 28. However, it got pushed back to December 12. The single featured the aforementioned remix of "Un-Thinkable (I'm Ready)" as the B-side. To promote the single, 12,000 filmmakers were invited over a period of six weeks to create a music video for the song. Keys then selected one of the six short-listed videos to be released as the song's official music video via YouTube and music television channels.

Critical reception

The Element of Freedom received generally positive reviews from critics. At Metacritic, which assigns a normalized rating out of 100 to reviews from mainstream publications, it received an average score of 67, based on 14 reviews. Andrew Burgess of musicOMH said that the album's production is "a perfect counterpoint to Keys' voice, and the sentiment she's trying to convey", while calling the album one of "the best pop albums of 2009". Chicago Tribune writer Greg Kot called the album Keys' "most consistent album and also her most low-key", and found it less "forced or gimmicky" than her previous albums. Killian Fox of The Observer called it "a confident, well-crafted modern soul record" that was made without "doing anything groundbreaking". Los Angeles Times writer Randy Lewis wrote favorably of Keys' thematic approach, stating that she "digs deep into the multitude of implications of independence". Leah Greenblatt of Entertainment Weekly said that Keys has "established herself as an increasingly rare thing in pop music: the class act", noting that the "often-banal lyrics" were carried by her "quicksilver" voice. USA Todays Steve Jones called its songs "consistently strong and thematically cohesive", and found the album "more nuanced and intimate" than Keys' previous work.

In a mixed review for The Independent, Simon Price found the songs monotonous and said that they "drift by disappointingly, anodyne and indistinguishable". Rob Sheffield, writing in Rolling Stone, felt that the production "compresses [Keys'] voice, making it sound a lot less like her, especially on the ballads". Mikael Wood of Spin accused Keys of being "uninterested in breaking new ground, snooze-controlling her way through a series of familiar piano-soul platitudes". Tyler Lewis of PopMatters pointed out in his review "uninspiring, trendy electronica production, strident lead vocal performances, and banal lyricism". Chicago Sun-Times writer Jim DeRogatis panned its lyrics as "empty cliches" and found the music pretentious. Robert Christgau, writing for MSN Music, named it "dud of the month", indicating "a bad record whose details rarely merit further thought". He interpreted Keys' attempt at "melismatic pain" to be "formal ploy merely, a diva-by-default's privilege", and found it "far from a shock but definitely a disappointment to watch Ms. Trained Pianist survey her branding options and choose the bland card over the brains card".

Accolades

|-  
! scope="row" rowspan="3"| 2010  
| rowspan="3"| NAACP Image Award  
| Outstanding Album  
| The Element of Freedom  
|   
| rowspan="3"|   
|-  
| Outstanding Music Video  
| "Try Sleeping with a Broken Heart" 
|  
|-  
| Outstanding Female Artist  
| Alicia Keys  
|   
|-  
! scope="row" rowspan="2"| 2010
| rowspan="2"| MTV Video Music Award Japan  
| Video of the Year  
| rowspan="2"| "Doesn't Mean Anything" 
|   
| rowspan="2"|   
|-  
| Best R&B Video 
|   
|- 
! scope="row" rowspan="2"| 2010 
| rowspan="2"| Teen Choice Award 
| Choice Music – R&B Artist 
| Alicia Keys 
|  
| rowspan="2"|  
|- 
| Choice Music – Album
| rowspan="3"| The Element of Freedom 
|  
|-
! scope="row"| 2010
| Premios Oye! 
| English Record of the Year
| 
|  
|- 
! scope="row" rowspan="2"| 2010
| rowspan="2"| American Music Award 
| Favorite Soul/R&B Album
|  
| rowspan="2"| 
|-
| Favorite Soul/R&B Female Artist 
| rowspan="2"| Alicia Keys 
| 
|- 
! scope="row" rowspan="4"| 2010 
| rowspan="4"| Soul Train Music Award
| Best R&B/Soul Female Artist 
| 
| rowspan="4"| 
|- 
| Best Album of the Year 
| The Element of Freedom 
|  
|- 
| Best Song of the Year
| rowspan="2"| "Un-Thinkable (I'm Ready)" 
|  
|- 
| The Ashford & Simpson Songwriter's Award 
| 
|- 
! scope="row" rowspan="2"| 2010 
| MP3 Music Award 
| The BFV Award 
| "Try Sleeping with a Broken Heart"
|  
|  
|-
| colspan="2"| The Record of the Year
| "Empire State of Mind (Part II) Broken Down"
| 
|  
|- 
! scope="row" rowspan="8"| 2011 
| colspan="2"| MTV Video Play Award 
| "Try Sleeping with a Broken Heart" 
| style="background-color:gold"|  
| 
|-
| Hungarian Music Award
| Modern Pop-Rock Album of the Year
| rowspan="2"| The Element of Freedom
| 
| 
|-
| Swiss Music Award
| Best Foreign Urban Album
| 
| 
|-
| NAACP Image Award
| Outstanding Music Video
| "Un-Thinkable (I'm Ready)"
| 
| 
|-
| rowspan="2"| New York Music Award
| Best R&B Single
| "Try Sleeping with a Broken Heart"
| 
| rowspan="2"| 
|-
| Best R&B Songwriter
| rowspan="2"| Alicia Keys
| 
|-
| rowspan="2"| RTHK International Pop Poll Award
| Top Female Artist
| 
| rowspan="2"| 
|-
| Top Ten International Gold Songs
| "Put It in a Love Song"
| 
|-
! scope="row" rowspan="2"| 2011
| rowspan="2"| Billboard Music Award
| Top R&B Artist
| Alicia Keys
| 
| rowspan="2"| 
|-
| Top R&B Song
| rowspan="2"| "Un-Thinkable (I'm Ready)"
| 
|-
! scope="row" rowspan="2"| 2011
| rowspan="2"| BMI Urban Award
| rowspan="2"| Award Winning Songs
| 
| rowspan="2"| 
|-
| "Try Sleeping with a Broken Heart"
| 
|}

Commercial performance
The Element of Freedom debuted at number two on the US Billboard 200, selling 417,000 copies in its first week. This became Keys' first album to not debut at number one on that chart. In its second week, the album fell to number four on the chart, selling an additional 280,000 copies. In its third week, the album climbed to number three, selling 80,000 more copies. In its fourth week, the album fell to number four, selling 62,000 copies. As of July 2014, it had sold 1.6 million copies in the US. On August 11, 2020, the album was certified double platinum by the Recording Industry Association of America (RIAA) for combined sales and album-equivalent units of over two million units in the United States.
 
In the United Kingdom, the album debuted at number 17 on the UK Albums Chart on December 20, 2009. It later climbed to number one on February 7, 2010, making it Keys' first album to ever to top the chart. It also spent 13 consecutive weeks atop the UK R&B Albums Chart. On July 22, 2013, the album was certified triple platinum by the British Phonographic Industry (BPI) for sales of over 900,000 copies in the UK. As of November 2016, the album has sold 1,015,071 copies in the United Kingdom.

In Canada, the album entered the Canadian Albums Chart at number five, and was certified platinum by the Music Canada (MC) on December 23, 2009 for shipments in excess of 80,000 units. In mainland Europe, the album reached number one in Switzerland, while charting within the top five in the Netherlands, Portugal, and Spain, and the top 10 in Germany, Norway, and Poland. As of August 2012, the album had sold over four million copies worldwide.

Track listing

Notes
  signifies a co-producer

Sample credits
 "Empire State of Mind (Part II) Broken Down" contains a sample from "Love on a Two-Way Street", written by Bert Keyes and Sylvia Robinson, as performed by The Moments.

Personnel
Credits adapted from the liner notes of the deluxe edition of The Element of Freedom.

Musicians
 Alicia Keys – B3 organ, concept, CP-70, keyboards, Moog bass, Moog synth, piano, Prophet organ, Rhodes, synths, synth programming, vocals, Wurlitzer
 Carlos Alomar – electric guitar 
 Beyoncé – featured vocals 
 Jeff Bhasker – background vocals , drum programming ; keyboards , synths , synth programming  
 Kerry Brothers Jr. – drum programming 
 Drake – background vocals 
 Toby Gad – guitar, keyboards 
 Jeff Gitelman – electric guitar 
 Ron Haney – electric guitar 
 LIV'RE – choir 
 Steve Mostyn – bass guitar , additional piano , Moog bass 
 Paul Pesco – acoustic guitar, electric guitar 
 Patrick "Plain Pat" Reynolds – drum programming 
 Davide Rossi – cello, strings arrangement, strings, viola, violin 
 Noah "40" Shebib – drum programming, keyboards 
 Al Shux – keyboards, programming 
 John "Jubu" Smith – electric guitar 
 Swizz Beatz – drum programming 
 Steven Wolf – live drums 

Additional personnel
 Kiku/BabyAlpaca – artwork, design
 Erwin Gorostiza – creative director
 Ashunta Sheriff – make-up
 Tippi Shorter – hair
 Yu Tsai – photography
 Wouri Vice – stylist

Technical personnel
 Alicia Keys – executive producer, producer
 Jeff Bhasker – producer
 Kerry Brothers Jr. – executive producer, producer
 Toby Gad – co-producer & additional engineering  
 Noah "40" Shebib – producer, recording  
 Al Shux – producer
 Swizz Beatz – producer 
 Peter Edge – executive producer
 Jeff Robinson – executive producer
 Erik Madrid – mix assistant
 Manny Marroquin – mixing 
 Tony Maserati – mixing 
 Christian Plata – mix assistant 
 Christian Baker – assistant engineer
 George Fullan – assistant engineer
 Ann Mincieli – engineer, recording, album coordination
 Val Brathwaite – assistant engineer
 Chris Soper – assistant engineer 
 Valente Torres – assistant engineer
 Miki Tsutsumi – assistant engineer, additional engineering
 Stuart White – assistant engineer, additional engineering, mix assistant
 Dave Kutch – mastering

Charts

Weekly charts

Year-end charts

Decade-end charts

Certifications

Release history

See also
 Album era
 List of Billboard number-one R&B albums of 2010
 List of UK Albums Chart number ones of the 2010s
 List of UK R&B Albums Chart number ones of 2010

Notes

References

External links
 Official website 

2009 albums
Albums produced by Al Shux
Albums produced by Alicia Keys
Albums produced by Jeff Bhasker
Albums produced by Noah "40" Shebib
Albums produced by Swizz Beatz
Albums produced by Toby Gad
Alicia Keys albums
J Records albums